Fosterella penduliflora is a plant species in the genus Fosterella. This species is native to Bolivia, Peru, and Argentina.

References

penduliflora
Flora of South America
Plants described in 1910